The 6th Crunchyroll Anime Awards was held on February 9, 2022, honoring excellence in anime from 2021. Crunchyroll opened the public nominations for judges on October 14, 2021, running until October 20. On December 16, Crunchyroll revealed the list of judges. Nominees was announced on January 18. Voting ended on January 25. Winners was announced on February 9.

This edition featured 26 categories, including new voice acting categories for German, French, Spanish (Latin America), Spanish (Spain), Portuguese, and Russian. Best Romance was also added for the first time. Best Action and Best Film were reinstated. However, Best Couple was dropped.

Jujutsu Kaisen received 16 nominations, with Attack on Titan: The Final Season Part 1, Odd Taxi, and Wonder Egg Priority receiving 11. Jujutsu Kaisen was nominated again for Anime of the Year, after previously winning it. It also received two nominations for Best Fight Scene. Its protagonist, Yuji Itadori, was nominated again. Sunghoo Park, the director of the series, was nominated again for Best Director. Eren Jaeger of Attack on Titan was nominated for both Best Protagonist and Antagonist. Tokyo Revengers received two nominations for Best Boy. Jujutsu Kaisen, Demon Slayer: Kimetsu no Yaiba, and Miss Kobayashi's Dragon Maid were nominated again for Best Animation. Yuki Kajiura and Go Shiina were nominated again for Best Score, along with Satoru Kōsaki and Hiroyuki Sawano, the latter receiving his third nomination for the award. Voice actors Laura Bailey, David Wald, and Anairis Quiñones received their second nominations for Best VA Performance (EN). Attack on Titan and Beastars both received nominations for both Best Opening Sequence and Best Ending Sequence. Previous winners Fruits Basket and Miss Kobayashi's Dragon Maid were also nominated for Best Drama and Best Comedy respectively, with the former receiving its third nomination for the award.

Series targeted towards the shōnen demographic entries dominated the awards, with Jujutsu Kaisen winning six. However, the first part of the final season of Attack on Titan won Anime of the Year. Bojji from Ranking of Kings won Best Boy, while Nobara Kugisaki from Jujutsu Kaisen won Best Girl. Odokawa from Odd Taxi won Best Protagonist, while Eren Jaeger  from Attack on Titan won Best Antagonist. Baku Kinoshita, director of Odd Taxi, won Best Director. Demon Slayer: Mugen Train Arc won Best Animation and Best Score. Yuki Kaji won Best VA Performance (JP), while David Wald won Best VA Performance (EN). René Dawn-Claude, Enzo Ratsito, Irwin Daayán, Marcel Navarro, Leo Rabelo, and Islam Gandzhaev won the inaugural Best VA Performance for German, French, Spanish (Latin America), Spanish (Spain), Portuguese, and Russian respectively. "Boku no Sensou" won Best Opening Sequence, while "Shirogane" won Best Ending Sequence. Jujutsu Kaisen won Best Action, Komi Can't Communicate won Best Comedy, To Your Eternity won Best Drama, Horimiya won Best Romance, and That Time I Got Reincarnated as a Slime won Best Fantasy. The film Demon Slayer: Kimetsu no Yaiba – The Movie: Mugen Train won Best Film.

Winners and nominees

Statistics

References

2022 awards in the United States
February 2022 events in the United States
Crunchyroll